Hooks Well Meadows, Great Cressingham is a  biological Site of Special Scientific Interest near Great Cressingham] in Norfolk.

This site has had a long history of traditional management. The diverse habitats include fen meadow, herb-rich wet grassland, acidic flushes, dry calcareous grassland and wet alder woodland, which has carpets of sphagnum mosses.

The site is a Ministry of Defence training area with no public access.

References

Sites of Special Scientific Interest in Norfolk